Maxime Annys (born 24 July 1986) is a retired Belgian football player and manager, who is currently managing Wellen in the Belgian Division 3.

Career
The defender began his career 2004 with Roeselare with which he enjoyed promotion to the Belgian Pro League. After two more seasons with Roeselare at the highest level, he had a short spell at Mons before moving abroad to MVV. He soon returned to Belgium to play one season for second division team Tournai before being signed by OH Leuven from the same division in 2009. After two more seasons with Leuven in the second division, he was again able to take part in promotion festivities as Leuven became second division champions in 2011. Following the 2011-12 season, he moved to Sint-Truiden, but during the 2012-13 season he was deemed surplus. In February 2013 Sint-Truiden agreed to terminate his contract to allow Annys to move as a free agent to Hjørring. After half a season at Hjørring, Annys returned to Belgium as he signed with Westerlo.

References

 
 

1986 births
Living people
Belgian footballers
Oud-Heverlee Leuven players
Belgian Pro League players
Challenger Pro League players
Eerste Divisie players
Belgian expatriate footballers
Expatriate men's footballers in Denmark
Belgian expatriate sportspeople in Denmark
Expatriate footballers in the Netherlands
Belgian expatriate sportspeople in the Netherlands
MVV Maastricht players
R.A.E.C. Mons players
K.S.V. Roeselare players
Sint-Truidense V.V. players
Vendsyssel FF players
K.V.C. Westerlo players
S.C. Eendracht Aalst players
Association football defenders